CHXR 73 is a star in the constellation Chamaeleon, about 620 light-years away from Earth.

The star is located within Cha I, a molecular cloud. It has a low temperature of 3,490 K typical of red dwarfs, but unlike typical red dwarfs it has an unusually large radius of —this is because of its young age, only 8 million years.

Planetary system
A companion, CHXR 73 b, has been found via direct imaging. CHXR 73 has a mass of about 12 Jupiters. This is close to the upper mass limit for planets, making its classification difficult.

References

Chamaeleon (constellation)
M-type main-sequence stars
Emission-line stars
Planetary systems with one confirmed planet
J11062877-7737331